Pavel Ivanovich Novitsky (June 23, 1857 – December 15, 1917, Malakhov Mound, Crimea) was a Vice Admiral (April 14, 1913) of the Russian Empire.

Since July 21, 1916 he was Chief Commander of Sevastopol port. After the February Revolution he was removed from the post. When Bolsheviks took power, he stayed in Sevastopol, was arrested and executed at Malakhov Mound together with a large group of other Navy officers.

References

1857 births
1917 deaths
Imperial Russian Navy admirals
Executed military leaders